Pierre de Ruel, marquis de Beurnonville (10 May 1752 – 23 April 1821) was a French general during the French Revolutionary Wars and later a marshal of France and Deputy Grand Master of Grand Orient de France.

Biography
Bournonville was born at  Champignol-lez-Mondeville, Aube.

After service in the colonies, he married a wealthy Creole, Geneviève Gillot L'Étang. After his return to France, he purchased the post of lieutenant of the Swiss Guard of the count of Provence.

During the French Revolution he was named lieutenant-general, and took an active part in the battles of Valmy and Jemmapes. Minister of War in February 1793, he denounced his old commander, Charles François Dumouriez, to the Convention, and was one of the four deputies sent to watch him.

Handed over by Dumouriez to the Austrians on 3 April 1793, Beurnonville was not exchanged until November 1795. He entered the service again, commanded the Army of Sambre-et-Meuse and Army of the North, and was appointed inspector of infantry of the Army of England in 1798. He was sent as ambassador to Berlin in 1800, and to Madrid in 1802.

Napoleon made him a senator and count of the empire. In 1814 he was a member of the provisional government organized after the abdication of Napoleon. He followed Louis XVIII to exile in Ghent, and after the second restoration was made marquis and marshal of France (1816).

Notes

References

Attribution
 Endnote:
 See A Chaquet, Les Guerres de la Révolution (Paris, 1886).

Source: 

1752 births
1821 deaths
People from Aube
Grand Croix of the Légion d'honneur
Military leaders of the French Revolutionary Wars
French Republican military leaders of the French Revolutionary Wars
French military personnel of the French Revolutionary Wars
Marshals of France
Burials at Père Lachaise Cemetery
French Freemasons
18th-century French politicians
French Ministers of War
Members of the Sénat conservateur
Counts of the First French Empire
Members of the Chamber of Peers of the Bourbon Restoration
Commanders of the Order of Saint Louis
Ambassadors of France to Spain
Ambassadors of France to Prussia
Names inscribed under the Arc de Triomphe